Pavel Sokol (born 30 June 1969) is a Czech former rower. He competed in two events at the 1992 Summer Olympics.

References

External links
 

1969 births
Living people
Czech male rowers
Olympic rowers of Czechoslovakia
Rowers at the 1992 Summer Olympics
People from Uherské Hradiště
Sportspeople from the Zlín Region